James W. Brault (February 10, 1932 – November 1, 2008) was a 20th-century scientist and a pioneer of Fourier transform spectroscopy. He was a world-leading expert in physical instrument design, numerical methods as applied to spectroscopy, and in atomic and molecular spectroscopy.

He graduated from Princeton University in 1962 as a student of Robert H. Dicke on the gravitational redshift of the sun and worked later at the Kitt Peak National Observatory, where he installed a high-resolution Fourier transform spectrometer used for astronomy, solar physics, and laboratory spectroscopy. In his early years, Brault was involved in the development of the lock-in amplifier, and of differential interference microscopy and phase modulation microscopy with Robert D. Allen.

References

 Sumner P. Davis, Mark C. Abrams, and James W. Brault, Fourier Transform Spectrometry, Academic Press, 2001. 
 Ginette Roland, James W. Brault, and Larry Testerman, Photometric Atlas of the Solar Spectrum from 1,850 to 10,000 cm−1, 164 pp., Kitt Peak National Observatory, 1981.
 James W. Brault, "Frequency Responsive Networks", U.S. Patent US3296464, 1967. 
 James W. Brault, "Gravitational redshift of solar lines", Bull. Am. Astron. Soc. 8, 28, 1963.
 Photograph during solar eclipse in 1965: http://www.noao.edu/image_gallery/html/im0323.html

Spectroscopists
Princeton University alumni
Place of birth missing
Place of death missing
1932 births
2008 deaths